Jane Preshaw (née Norgate, 30 May 1839 – 12 December 1926) was a New Zealand nurse, midwife and hospital matron of Reefton Hospital.

Preshaw was born in Little Plumstead, Norfolk, England, in 1839. She emigrated to Melbourne, Australia in 1856, at age 17, where she became a general servant and later a domestic nurse and midwife. During her time in Melbourne she gave birth to her daughter Alice in 1859 or 1860 but it was not known if she married Alice's father.

In about 1868 Preshaw and Alice left Melbourne for Hokitika, New Zealand, and settled in Reefton. Preshaw worked as a nurse and midwife, becoming the first matron of Reefton Hospital in 1876. She married the hospital's chemist David Preshaw in 1879. Together they were the first Master and Matron of the hospital. They ran the hospital together until 1901 after which Preshaw continued to work as a private midwife.

She died in Reefton in 1926.

References

External links
 Photo of Jane Preshaw in Alexander Turnbull Library

1839 births
1926 deaths
New Zealand midwives
New Zealand nurses
19th-century New Zealand people
New Zealand women nurses